Homer Bedford (March 16, 1880 – March 26, 1968) was an American politician who served as the Treasurer of Colorado from 1933 to 1935, 1937 to 1939, 1941 to 1943, 1945 to 1947, 1949 to 1951, 1953 to 1955, 1957 to 1959 and from 1963 to 1967. He served as the Auditor of Colorado from 1935 to 1937, 1939 to 1941, 1947 to 1949, 1951 to 1953, 1955 to 1957 and from 1959 to 1963.

References

1880 births
1968 deaths
State treasurers of Colorado
Colorado Democrats